José Guadalupe Alanís Tamez (4 June 1910 – 3 May 2003) was a Mexican sports shooter. He competed in the 25 m pistol event at the 1948 Summer Olympics held at London.

References

1910 births
2003 deaths
Mexican male sport shooters
Sportspeople from Monterrey
Olympic shooters of Mexico
Shooters at the 1948 Summer Olympics